Mi Mundo (English: My World) is the third studio album recorded by Nicaraguan salsa singer-songwriter Luis Enrique. The album was released by CBS Discos in 1989 (see 1989 in music). The became one of the best selling tropical albums in the 1980s. The album was given a Premio Lo Nuestro award for "Tropical Album of the Year" in 1990.

Track listing
 "Solo" (Luis Enrique Mejía) – 4:41
 "Mi Mundo" (Jorge Luis Piloto) – 4:43
 "Corazón Loco" (Luis Enrique Mejía) – 4:38
 "Yo No Puedo Ser Tu Amante" (Manny Benito, Alejandro Jaén) – 4:20
 "San Juan Sin Ti" (Omar Alfanno) – 4:08
 "Lo Que Pasó Entre Tú y Yo...Pasó" (Jorge Luis Piloto) – 3:39
 "Llegó el Amor" (Luis Enrique Mejía) – 4:56
 "Una Nueva Canción" (Luis Enrique Mejía) – 4:32

Credits and personnel
 Luis Enrique – vocals
Mixed by Adalberto (Eddie) Rivera

Chart position

References

1989 albums
Luis Enrique (singer) albums
Spanish-language albums
CBS Discos albums